This is the discography of British singer-songwriter Tom Robinson. He has released one studio album as part of Café Society, two as part of the Tom Robinson Band, one as part of Sector 27, one as part of Faith, Folk and Anarchy, one with King Crimson lead singer Jakko Jakszyk and eight solo albums. He has also released fan club-only bootlegs known as the Castaway Club series.

Albums

Studio albums

Live albums

Compilation albums

Video albums

Other albums

EPs

Singles

Notes

References

Discographies of British artists
Pop music discographies
Rock music discographies
New wave discographies